The NEXT Foundation is a privately funded New Zealand strategic philanthropy foundation launched in March 2014. It has a mandate to spend down $100 million over 10 years into environmental and educational projects that will benefit future generations of New Zealanders. NEXT Foundation invests in a small number of multi year initiatives with both financial and non financial support.  It targets initiatives that are transformational, inspirational and run in a business like way.

It was established in 2014 by an endowment of NZ$100 million by New Zealand philanthropists Neal and Annette Plowman, who support the philosophy of giving while living, and who have a long history of philanthropy in New Zealand. Before the formation of NEXT most of it was under the radar.

NEXT Foundation is led by a group of prominent New Zealand businesspeople. NEXT's founding Chairman was Chris Liddell, previous Chairman of Xero and former CFO of Microsoft and General Motors. Liddell stepped down as chairman in 2017, to take up a role with the United States Government in the Whitehouse, with  director Barrie Brown taking over as chairman and retiring First NZ Capital chief executive Scott St John joining the board.

NEXT CEO is Bill Kermode, a  founding director of one of New Zealand’s leading private equity companies, Direct Capital.

Projects

Environment 
Zero Invasive Predators (ZIP) is a development and research organisation focused on technologies and processes to keep large areas of New Zealand’s mainland free of predators (primarily rats, stoats and possums) to regenerate New Zealand’s native bird life. ZIP is also supported by the New Zealand Department of Conservation, local philanthropists Gareth and Sam Morgan and some major Dairy companies, including Fonterra, Open Country, Synlait, Miraka, Tatua and Westland Milk Products.

Project Taranaki Mounga is a ten-year $24 million project, controlling pests and reintroducing native bird and bat species in the 34,000ha of Egmont National Park. It is a partnership between NEXT Foundation, DOC, local iwi, Shell, TSB Community Trust, Landcare Research, Jasmine Social Investments and the wider Taranaki community. A milestone for the project was hit in April 2017 where the North Island Robin was reintroduced. The project was the winner of the Philanthropy and Partnership category in this years Green Ribbon Awards.

Predator Free Wellington City is a partnership between the NEXT Foundation, Wellington City Council and the Greater Wellington Regional Council, to make Wellington the first predator-free capital in the world. NEXT Foundation has also supported Kelvin Hastie as the NEXT Predator Free Community Champion to help make this project a success.

Rotoroa Island is an island in the Hauraki Gulf next to Waiheke Island. The Rotoroa Island Trust’s vision is for the island to become a sanctuary where people can experience the wonder of New Zealand wildlife. Rotoroa Island is a conservation park in the Hauraki Gulf for endangered species like Kiwi and Takahe, and also offers an environmental educational programme for schools through its strong relationship with Auckland Zoo.

Project Janszoon aims to transform the ecological prospects of the Abel Tasman National Park. Project Janszoon is part of the Tomorrow Accord which commits the government to maintaining the projects once they have achieved agreed ecological indicators. Project Janszoon was the winner of the Conservation, Habitat and Diversity section of the Green Ribbon Environmental Awards.

Education 
Springboard Trust provides leadership and strategic skills programmes for school principals that improve the learning outcomes for students. Next Foundation is helping Springboard expand its ‘Strategic Leadership for Principals’ programme throughout New Zealand in the coming years.

The Mind Lab by Unitec is an institution based in Auckland that is focused on up-skilling teachers in technology and modern teaching methods. The program provides a modern postgraduate qualification for educators that teaches them how to implement this new approach into their classrooms. Currently based in Auckland, Wellington, Christchurch and Gisborne, NEXT Foundation is helping Mind Lab expand into other centres across New Zealand and also funding scholarships for up to 1,350 new teachers to complete the programme.

Manaiakalani Outreach is an expansion of the successful Manaiakalani approach, piloted in and around Pt England School in East Auckland, into five clusters of schools throughout low socio-economic communities in New Zealand. Manaiakalani Outreach will provide this proven digital approach to over 8,500 students throughout New Zealand. The Manaiakalani Outreach programme uses an evidence based system with collaborative learning pedagogies enhanced by modern digital learning environments incorporated in a full community approach to increasing the learning outcomes for their students.

Ngā Pūmanawa e Waru aims to improve learning outcomes for all students in the city of Rotorua. It uses collaborative learning pedagogies within and between schools, enhanced by digital teaching environments to do this. Ngā Pūmanawa e Waru is equipping students with digital devices and up-skilling teachers to reduce the education inequality faced in Rotorua.

Talking Matters is a programme that promotes the importance of talking with babies. This programme is designed to address the differences in language children have when they start school. It is a community-based programme that focusses on the child's brain development in the first 0–3 years.

Teach First NZ recruits graduates to bring knowledge, energy and leadership to teach in secondary schools serving lower decile communities. Their vision extends beyond the two years in the classroom to encourage debate and action in response to system-wide factors, outside the control of a school, that impact upon educational outcomes.

References

External links
 Official website

Educational organisations based in New Zealand
Environmental organisations based in New Zealand
Foundations based in New Zealand